The 1947–48 season was Newport County's first season back in Division Three South since relegation from the Second Division the previous season.

Season review

Results summary

Results by round

Fixtures and results

Third Division South

FA Cup

Welsh Cup

League table

External links
 Newport County 1947-1948 : Results
 Newport County football club match record: 1948
 Welsh Cup 1947/48

References

 Amber in the Blood: A History of Newport County. 

1947-48
English football clubs 1947–48 season
1947–48 in Welsh football